Never Shall We Be Enslaved also known as Thu Kyun Ma Khan Pyi, is a  1997 Burmese historical-war drama film, directed by Kyi Soe Tun starring Nyunt Win, Nay Aung, Kyaw Thu, Kyaw Ye Aung, Lwin Moe, May Than Nu, San Shar Tin and Nandar Hlaing.

Synopsis
On May 7, 1885, at a time when Burma was about to fall to the British. Also in the King's Palace, the Lord of Navy (Nyunt Win) and Bo Kyaw Khaung (Kyaw Ye Aung) were trying to join forces with the French to defend themselves. A group of Bo Thurain (Kyaw Thu) and Bo Min Htin (Lwin Moe), loyal to Prince of Nyaungyan, were trying to defend their own kingdom without relying on anyone. At that time, there was a time of disunity and ethnic division, and the British took advantage of the illegal logging and tried to take over the country. Who fought to keep the Burmese state from falling under its rule? How to defend the country and the nation is a good film that will inspire patriotism.

Cast
Nyunt Win as Lord of Navy
Nay Aung as Sawbwa of Hsenwi State
Kyaw Thu as Bo Thurain
Kyaw Ye Aung as Bo Kyaw Khaung
Lwin Moe as Bo Min Htin
May Than Nu as Saw Shin Oo
San Shar Tin as Hsinbyumashin
Nandar Hlaing as Khin Phone
Mandalay Thein Zaw as Sawbwa of Mongnai State
Kyaw Nyein Aye as King Thibaw
Cho Thin as Queen consort Supayalat
Aung Kyaw as Chief Minister
Mos as Doon Oo
Alexander Babic as General Prendergast
San Myint as Colonel Sladen

Award

References

External links

1997 films
1990s Burmese-language films
Burmese drama films
Films shot in Myanmar
1997 drama films